Janzen Blade Tidwell (born June 8, 2001) is an American professional baseball pitcher in the New York Mets organization.

Amateur career
Tidwell attended Loretto High School in Loretto, Tennessee, where he played baseball and was teammates with Ryan Weathers. In 2019, his junior year, he was named Tennessee Mr. Baseball after going 8-0 with 107 strikeouts alongside batting .557. He played only one game during his senior season in 2020 due to the COVID-19 pandemic.

In 2021, as a freshman for the Tennessee Volunteers baseball team, Tidwell was inserted into their starting rotation. He finished his freshman season starting 18 games and going 10-3 with a 3.74 ERA and ninety strikeouts over  innings. He was named to the USA Baseball National Collegiate Team after the season alongside teammate Drew Gilbert. Tidwell entered the 2022 season as a preseason All-American and a top prospect for the upcoming draft. He missed the beginning of the season dealing with shoulder soreness. After missing Tennessee's first 24 games, he made his season debut in late March, pitching one inning in relief. He made his first start of the season on April 5 in a 5-1 win versus Lipscomb. He finished the season having appeared in 13 games (making nine starts), going 3-2 with a 3.00 ERA and 51 strikeouts over 39 innings.

Professional career
Tidwell was selected by the New York Mets in the second round with the 52nd overall selection of the 2022 Major League Baseball draft. He signed with the team for $1.8 million.

Tidwell made his professional debut with the Florida Complex League Mets and was promoted to the St. Lucie Mets after one game. Over  innings pitched for the season, he went 0-1 with a 1.93 ERA, 11 strikeouts, and seven walks.

References

External links
Tennessee Volunteers bio

2001 births
Living people
Baseball players from Tennessee
Baseball pitchers
Tennessee Volunteers baseball players
United States national baseball team players
Florida Complex League Mets players
St. Lucie Mets players